Chittendra Nath Mazumder is a Bharatiya Janata Party politician from Assam. He has been elected in Assam Legislative Assembly election in 1991 from Hailakandi constituency.

References 

Living people
Bharatiya Janata Party politicians from Assam
Members of the Assam Legislative Assembly
People from Hailakandi district
Year of birth missing (living people)